The Korea University Libraries is the library system of Korea University. With over 2.5 million volumes, it is one of the largest academic library systems in South Korea.

Libraries in the system
 Main Library - Opened in 1978, the Main Library contains about 800,000 pieces of data—the largest collection in any private university library in South Korea.
 Haesong Law Library - the Haesong Law Library boasts the largest collection of any Korean law facility.
 Centennial Digital Library
 Science Library - the Science Library contains about 330,000 books, with a focus on engineering, medicine, and natural science.
 Graduate School Library - built in 1937 to celebrate the 30th anniversary of Bosung College. It has been designated as Historic Site No. 286.

Library holdings
(As of April 1, 2008)
 Print Materials, Non-Books : 2,510,470 vols
 E-Resources : 172,557 titles

References

External links
 library.korea.ac.kr

Libraries in Seoul
Korea University